Sciadosoma umbrosum is a species of beetle in the family Cerambycidae, the only species in the genus Sciadosoma.

References

Acanthocinini